Dualism in terms of politics, refers to specific political concepts that are related to functional or structural duality of a particular political system. In some states, functional dualism is manifested through the division of power between two main branches of government (legislative and executive). In other, mainly complex states, structural dualism is expressed as a division of power between two constitutive units.

Functional dualism is common in parliamentary systems, like those in the Netherlands, Luxembourg and Sweden, where the term dualism is used to refer to the functional separation of powers between the cabinet and parliament. Unlike the presidential system, the legislative branch consists of the cabinet together with the parliament and cabinets are formed on basis of a majority in parliament. Unlike the Westminster parliamentary system, cabinet ministers cannot be members of parliament. An important political issue is whether ministers and leaders of governing parliamentary parties should prepare important political decisions. According to the dualistic position, members of parliament of governing parties should function independently of their cabinet. The term monism is used to refer to a stance that important decisions should be prepared by the members of the governing coalition in order to promote political stability.

Structural dualism is manifested in those dual states, like dual monarchies, that are constituted as real unions. One of the most notable examples of state dualism in modern history was the Austro-Hungarian Monarchy (1867–1918), where dualism was manifested as an official political doctrine of co-equality between Austria and Hungary. The phrase "during dualism" is used in Hungarian historiography as shorthand for "during the Dual Monarchy."

Trialism
As in dualism, same functional and structural distinctions are also manifested in trialistic political concepts, referring to three instead of two political subjects. In functional trialism, distinction between three main branches of government (legislative, executive and judicial) is emphasized, while structural trialisam refers to internal political structure of triune states. In history, one of the most notable examples of trialism was manifested as a political concept that advocated transformation of the dual Austro-Hungarian Monarchy into a triune state, by creating a third constituent entity. The proposition was that this was to be achieved by the equalisation of the Kingdom of Croatia-Slavonia to the two other monarchies in the empire, a conjecture that was supported by the assassinated Franz Ferdinand. (see Assassination of Archduke Franz Ferdinand).

See also
 Ministerial by-elections
 Norwegian Law (Israel)
 Dual mandate
 Dual monarchy

References

Sources
 

Politics
Political theories